State University of Bangladesh (SUB) is a private university in Dhanmondi, Dhaka, Bangladesh. It was established in 2002 under the Private University Act 1992.

Board of Trustees 
 Dr. A. M. Shamim - President
 Dr. Md. Mahbubur Rahman - Vice President
 Ms. Saleha Ahamed - Member
 Dr. Shuchorita Ahmed - Member
 Ms. Mosteka Rahman - Member
 Mr. Sakif Shamim - Member
 Ms. Tasfia Farheen - Member
 Mr. Mubashshir Mubarrat Rahman - Member

List of vice-chancellors 
 Prof. Dr. Md. Anwarul Kabir ( present )

Academic departments 
 Architecture
 Business Studies
 Computer Science & Engineering
 English Studies
 Environmental Science
 Food Engineering & Technology
 Journalism, Communication, & Media Studies
 Law
 Pharmacy
 Public Health

Academic programs 
Undergraduate programs
 B.Arch – Bachelor of Architecture
 B.B.A. – Bachelor of Business Administration
 B.Sc. in Computer Science & Engineering
 B.A. (Hons) in English
 B.Sc. in Food Engineering & Technology
 LL.B. (Hons) – Bachelor of Laws
 B. Pharm. – Bachelor of Pharmacy
 B.S.S. (Hons) in Journalism, Communication and Media Studies (J.C.M.S.)

Graduate programs
 LL.M. – Master of Laws
 M.A. in Applied Linguistics & E.L.T.
 M.A. in English
 M.B.A. Executive
 M.B.A. in Healthcare Management
 M.P.H. Friday & Regular Batch
 M. Pharm. – Master of Pharmacy
 M.S. in Environmental Science
 M.Sc. in Food Engineering and Technology

Permanent campus 
The permanent campus of (SUB) will be located at its own land ( area 3 acres) in Kanchan, Purbachal, Dhaka. The architect of this permanent campus is Vistaara Architects (Pvt) Limited represented by its Managing Director Arch Mustapha Khalid. The engineers and project managers of this new campus expect that 50% work will be done by the end of 2018 and rest of the task shall be completed by the end of 2020. The university's administrations are optimistic that few departments will be relocating at Baridhara permanent campus by end of 2018. All the departments will have their own space with dedicated classrooms and common facilities for faculty and students. Special facilities will include spacious design studios for Architecture, J.C.M.S. multimedia lab, C.S.E. computer lab, Pharmacy lab, Food Engineering lab, Library, Auditorium, University Canteen, Club rooms, Gymnasium, playgrounds for Indoor and Outdoor Games, and separate dormitories for male and female students and teachers, etc. Both the dormitory and academic buildings will have free WiFi internet facility, with a CCTV network, ensuring the safety and security of all within the premises. Regular transportation among the campuses is available.

Footnotes

External links
 SUB official website

Dhanmondi
Architecture schools in Bangladesh
Universities and colleges in Dhaka
Private universities in Bangladesh
Educational institutions established in 2002
2002 establishments in Bangladesh